The Realness is a music podcast hosted by Mary Harris and Christopher M. Johnson and produced by WNYC Studios.

Background 
The show was about the life of Albert Johnson, also known as Prodigy of Mobb Deep. Episode three discusses Prodigy's family and their various musical influences. The show discusses Prodigy's struggle with sickle cell disease and its influence on Mobb Deep's music. Prodigy's childhood doctor was Yvette Francis-McBarnette. The podcast won the 2019 National Association of Black Journalists award for best lifestyle podcast. The first episode introduces the listener to Prodigy and the second episode looks at the historical moment in which Prodigy was born.

See also 

 List of music podcasts

References

External links 
 

Audio podcasts
Music podcasts
2018 podcast debuts
2018 podcast endings
WNYC Studios programs
Documentary podcasts